Melisa López Franzen (née López Aquino, born 1980) is an American politician and member of the Minnesota Senate. A member of the Minnesota Democratic–Farmer–Labor Party (DFL), she represents District 49 in the southwest Twin Cities metropolitan area, serving the Minneapolis suburbs of Edina, Eden Prairie, Bloomington, and Minnetonka.

Early life, education, and career
Franzen was raised in Puerto Rico. She attended the Interamerican University of Puerto Rico and graduated in 2001 with a Bachelor of Arts in political science. She later attended the Hubert H. Humphrey School of Public Affairs at the University of Minnesota, graduating in 2003 with a Master of Public Policy in economic development, and Hamline University School of Law, graduating in 2006 with a Juris Doctor

For eight years, Franzen was an attorney at Target Corporation, where she held various positions in government affairs and community relations. She co-founded and is president of the Minneapolis-based public relations firm New Publica.

Minnesota Senate
Franzen was elected to the Minnesota Senate in 2012 and reelected in 2016 and 2020. She serves on the Finance, Human Services Reform Finance and Policy, and as Ranking Minority Chair of the Commerce and Consumer Protection Finance and Policy Committee.

In 2022, after new legislative maps put Franzen in the same district as a colleague, Franzen announced she was not running for re-election.

Personal life
Franzen has been married to Nathan Franzen since January 14, 2006. They have two children and reside in Edina, Minnesota.

References

External links

Official Senate website
Official campaign website

1980 births
21st-century American politicians
21st-century American women politicians
American politicians of Puerto Rican descent
Democratic Party Minnesota state senators
Hamline University School of Law alumni
Humphrey School of Public Affairs alumni
Interamerican University of Puerto Rico alumni
Living people
People from Edina, Minnesota
Women state legislators in Minnesota